Gilder is a surname.

Gilder may also refer to:
 Gilder, Iran, a village in East Azerbaijan Province, Iran
 Gilder, a craftsperson who performs gilding
 Gilder, a character in the video game Skies of Arcadia

See also
 Guilder
 Van Gilder (disambiguation)